An electric field (sometimes E-field) is the physical field that surrounds electrically charged particles and exerts force on all other charged particles in the field, either attracting or repelling them. It also refers to the physical field for a system of charged particles. Electric fields originate from electric charges and time-varying electric currents. Electric fields and magnetic fields are both manifestations of the electromagnetic field, one of the four fundamental interactions (also called forces) of nature.

Electric fields are important in many areas of physics, and are exploited in electrical technology. In atomic physics and chemistry, for instance, the electric field is the attractive force holding the atomic nucleus and electrons together in atoms. It is also the force responsible for chemical bonding between atoms that result in molecules.

The electric field is defined as a vector field that associates to each point in space the electrostatic (Coulomb) force per unit of charge exerted on an infinitesimal positive test charge at rest at that point. The derived SI unit for the electric field is the volt per meter (V/m), which is equal to the newton per coulomb (N/C).

Description

The electric field is defined at each point in space as the force per unit charge that would be experienced by a vanishingly small positive test charge if held stationary at that point. As the electric field is defined in terms of force, and force is a vector (i.e. having both magnitude and direction), it follows that an electric field is a vector field. Fields that may be defined in this manner are sometimes referred to as force fields. The electric field acts between two charges similarly to the way the gravitational field acts between two masses, as they both obey an inverse-square law with distance. This is the basis for Coulomb's law, which states that, for stationary charges, the electric field varies with the source charge and varies inversely with the square of the distance from the source. This means that if the source charge were doubled, the electric field would double, and if you move twice as far away from the source, the field at that point would be only one-quarter its original strength.

The electric field can be visualized with a set of lines whose direction at each point is the same as the field's, a concept introduced by Michael Faraday, whose term 'lines of force' is still sometimes used. This illustration has the useful property that the field's strength is proportional to the density of the lines. Field lines due to stationary charges have several important properties, including always originating from positive charges and terminating at negative charges, they enter all good conductors at right angles, and they never cross or close in on themselves. The field lines are a representative concept; the field actually permeates all the intervening space between the lines. More or fewer lines may be drawn depending on the precision to which it is desired to represent the field. The study of electric fields created by stationary charges is called electrostatics.

Faraday's law describes the relationship between a time-varying magnetic field and the electric field. One way of stating Faraday's law is that the curl of the electric field is equal to the negative time derivative of the magnetic field. In the absence of time-varying magnetic field, the electric field is therefore called conservative (i.e. curl-free). This implies there are two kinds of electric fields: electrostatic fields and fields arising from time-varying magnetic fields. While the curl-free nature of the static electric field allows for a simpler treatment using electrostatics, time-varying magnetic fields are generally treated as a component of a unified electromagnetic field. The study of time varying magnetic and electric fields is called electrodynamics.

Mathematical formulation

Electric fields are caused by electric charges, described by Gauss's law, and time varying magnetic fields, described by Faraday's law of induction. Together, these laws are enough to define the behavior of the electric field. However, since the magnetic field is described as a function of electric field, the equations of both fields are coupled and together form Maxwell's equations that describe both fields as a function of charges and currents.

Electrostatics

In the special case of a steady state (stationary charges and currents), the Maxwell-Faraday inductive effect disappears. The resulting two equations (Gauss's law  and Faraday's law with no induction term ), taken together, are equivalent to Coulomb's law, which states that a particle with electric charge  at position  exerts a force on a particle with charge  at position  of:

When the charges  and  have the same sign this force is positive, directed away from the other charge, indicating the particles repel each other. When the charges have unlike signs the force is negative, indicating the particles attract.
To make it easy to calculate the Coulomb force on any charge at position  this expression can be divided by  leaving an expression that only depends on the other charge (the source charge)

This is the electric field at point  due to the point charge ; it is a vector-valued function equal to the Coulomb force per unit charge that a positive point charge would experience at the position .
Since this formula gives the electric field magnitude and direction at any point  in space (except at the location of the charge itself, where it becomes infinite) it defines a vector field.
From the above formula it can be seen that the electric field due to a point charge is everywhere directed away from the charge if it is positive, and toward the charge if it is negative, and its magnitude decreases with the inverse square of the distance from the charge.

The Coulomb force on a charge of magnitude  at any point in space is equal to the product of the charge and the electric field at that point

The SI unit of the electric field is the newton per coulomb (N/C), or volt per meter (V/m); in terms of the SI base units it is kg⋅m⋅s−3⋅A−1.

Superposition principle
Due to the linearity of Maxwell's equations, electric fields satisfy the superposition principle, which states that the total electric field, at a point, due to a collection of charges is equal to the vector sum of the electric fields at that point due to the individual charges. This principle is useful in calculating the field created by multiple point charges. If charges  are stationary in space at points , in the absence of currents, the superposition principle says that the resulting field is the sum of fields generated by each particle as described by Coulomb's law:

where  is the unit vector in the direction from point  to point .

Continuous charge distributions 
The superposition principle allows for the calculation of the electric field due to a continuous distribution of charge  (where  is the charge density in coulombs per cubic meter). By considering the charge  in each small volume of space  at point  as a point charge, the resulting electric field, at point  can be calculated as 

The total field is then found by "adding up" the contributions from all the increments of volume by integrating over the volume of the charge distribution :

Similar equations follow for a surface charge with continuous charge distribution  where  is the charge density in coulombs per square meter

and for line charges with continuous charge distribution  where  is the charge density in coulombs per meter.

Electric potential

If a system is static, such that magnetic fields are not time-varying, then by Faraday's law, the electric field is curl-free. In this case, one can define an electric potential, that is, a function  such that  This is analogous to the gravitational potential. The difference between the electric potential at two points in space is called the potential difference (or voltage) between the two points.

In general, however, the electric field cannot be described independently of the magnetic field. Given the magnetic vector potential, defined so that  one can still define an electric potential  such that:

Faraday's law of induction can be recovered by taking the curl of that equation 

Continuous vs. discrete charge representation 

The equations of electromagnetism are best described in a continuous description. However, charges are sometimes best described as discrete points; for example, some models may describe electrons as point sources where charge density is infinite on an infinitesimal section of space.

A charge  located at  can be described mathematically as a charge density , where the Dirac delta function (in three dimensions) is used. Conversely, a charge distribution can be approximated by many small point charges.

Electrostatic fields

Electrostatic fields are electric fields that do not change with time. Such fields are present when systems of charged matter are stationary, or when  electric currents are unchanging. In that case, Coulomb's law fully describes the field.

Parallels between electrostatic and gravitational fields
Coulomb's law, which describes the interaction of electric charges:

is similar to Newton's law of universal gravitation:

(where ).

This suggests similarities between the electric field E and the gravitational field g, or their associated potentials. Mass is sometimes called "gravitational charge".

Electrostatic and gravitational forces both are central, conservative and obey an inverse-square law.

Uniform fields

A uniform field is one in which the electric field is constant at every point. It can be approximated by placing two conducting plates parallel to each other and maintaining a voltage (potential difference) between them; it is only an approximation because of boundary effects (near the edge of the planes, electric field is distorted because the plane does not continue). Assuming infinite planes, the magnitude of the electric field E is:

where ΔV is the potential difference between the plates and d is the distance separating the plates. The negative sign arises as positive charges repel, so a positive charge will experience a force away from the positively charged plate, in the opposite direction to that in which the voltage increases.

Electrodynamic fields

Electrodynamic fields are electric fields which do change with time, for instance when charges are in motion. In this case, a magnetic field is produced in accordance with Ampère's circuital law (with Maxwell's addition), which, along with Maxwell's other equations, defines the magnetic field, in terms of its curl:

That is, both electric currents (i.e. charges in uniform motion) and the (partial) time derivative of the electric field directly contributes to the magnetic field. In addition, the Maxwell–Faraday equation states 

These represent two of Maxwell's four equations and they intricately link the electric and magnetic fields together, resulting in the electromagnetic field. The equations represent a set of four coupled multi-dimensional partial differential equations which, when solved for a system, describe the combined behavior of the electromagnetic fields. In general, the force experienced by a test charge in an electromagnetic field is given by the Lorentz force law:

Energy in the electric field

The total energy per unit volume stored by the electromagnetic field is

As  and  fields are coupled, it would be misleading to split this expression into "electric" and "magnetic" contributions. In particular, an electrostatic field in any given frame of reference in general transforms into a field with a magnetic component in a relatively moving frame. Accordingly, decomposing the electromagnetic field into an electric and magnetic component is frame-specific, and similarly for the associated energy.

The total energy U stored in the electromagnetic field in a given volume V is

The electric displacement field

Definitive equation of vector fields

In the presence of matter, it is helpful to extend the notion of the electric field into three vector fields:

Since E and P are defined separately, this equation can be used to define .

Constitutive relation

The E and D fields are related by the permittivity of the material, ε.

For linear, homogeneous, isotropic materials E and D are proportional and constant throughout the region, there is no position dependence: 

For inhomogeneous materials, there is a position dependence throughout the material:

Materials can have varying extents of linearity, homogeneity and isotropy.

Relativistic Effects on electric field

Point charge in uniform motion 
The invariance of the form of Maxwell's equations under Lorentz transformation can be used to derive the electric field of a uniformly moving point charge. The charge of a particle is considered frame invariant, as supported by experimental evidence. Alternatively the electric field of uniformly moving point charges can be derived from the Lorentz transformation of four-force experienced by test charges in the source's rest frame given by Coulomb's law and assigning electric field and magnetic field by their definition given by the form of Lorentz force. However the following equation is only applicable when no acceleration is involved in the particle's history where Coulomb's law can be considered or symmetry arguments can be used for solving Maxwell's equations in a simple manner. The electric field of such a uniformly moving point charge is hence given by:

The above equation reduces to that given by Coulomb's law for non-relativistic speeds of the point charge. Spherically symmetry is not satisfied due to breaking of symmetry in the problem by specification of direction of velocity for calculation of field. To illustrate this, field lines of moving charges are sometimes represented as unequally spaced radial lines which would appear equally spaced in a co-moving reference frame.

Propagation of disturbances in electric fields 

Special theory of relativity imposes the principle of locality, that requires cause and effect to be time-like separated events where the causal efficacy does not travel faster than the speed of light. Maxwell's laws are found to confirm to this view since the general solutions of fields are given in terms of retarded time which indicate that electromagnetic disturbances travel at the speed of light. Advanced time, which also provides a solution for Maxwell's law are ignored as an unphysical solution.For the motion of a charged particle, considering for example the case of a moving particle with the above described electric field coming to an abrupt stop, the electric fields at points far from it do not immediately revert to that classically given for a stationary charge. On stopping, the field around the stationary points begin to revert to the expected state and this effect propagates outwards at the speed of light while the electric field lines far away from this will continue to point radially towards an assumed moving charge. This virtual particle will never be outside the range of propagation of the disturbance in electromagnetic field, since charged particles are restricted to have speeds slower than that of light, which makes it impossible to construct a Gaussian surface in this region that violates Gauss' law. Another technical difficulty that supports this is that charged particles travelling faster than or equal to speed of light no longer have a unique retarded time. Since electric field lines are continuous, an electromagnetic pulse of radiation is generated that connects at the boundary of this disturbance travelling outwards at the speed of light. In general, any accelerating point charge radiates electromagnetic waves however, non-radiating acceleration is possible in a systems of charges.

Arbitrarily moving point charge 

For arbitrarily moving point charges, propagation of potential fields such as Lorenz gauge fields at the speed of light needs to be accounted for by using Liénard–Wiechert potential. Since the potentials satisfy Maxwell's equations, the fields derived for point charge also satisfy Maxwell's equations. The electric field is expressed as:

The retarded time is given as solution of:

Electromagnetic radiation of accelerating charges is known to be caused by the acceleration dependent term in the electric field from which relativistic correction for Larmor formula is obtained. 

There exist yet another set of solutions for Maxwell's equation of the same form but for advanced time  instead of retarded time given as a solution of:

Since the physical interpretation of this indicates that the electric field at a point is governed by the particle's state at a point of time in the future, it is considered as an unphysical solution and hence neglected. However, there have been theories exploring the advanced time solutions of Maxwell's equations, such as Feynman Wheeler absorber theory.

The above equation, although consistent with that of uniformly moving point charges as well as its non-relativistic limit, are not corrected for quantum-mechanical effects.

Some common electric field values
Infinite wire having uniform charge density  has electric field at a distance  from it as 
Infinitely large surface having charge density  has electric field at a distance  from it as  
Infinitely long cylinder having Uniform charge density  that is charge contained along unit length of the cylinder has electric field at a distance  from it as  while it is  everywhere inside the cylinder 
Uniformly charged non-conducting sphere of radius , volume charge density  and total charge  has electric field at a distance  from it as  while the electric field at a point  inside sphere from its center is given by  
Uniformly charged conducting sphere of radius , surface charge density  and total charge  has electric field at a distance  from it as  while the electric field inside is  
Electric field infinitely close to a conducting surface in electrostatic equilibrium having charge density  at that point is  
Uniformly charged ring having total charge  has electric field at a distance  along its axis as ' 
Uniformly charged disc of radius  and charge density  has electric field at a distance  along its axis from it as  
Further generalization is given by multipole expansion.

See also
 Classical electromagnetism
 Relativistic electromagnetism
 Electricity
 History of electromagnetic theory
 Electromagnetic field
 Magnetism
 Teltron tube
 Teledeltos, a conductive paper that may be used as a simple analog computer for modelling fields

References

External links 

 Electric field in "Electricity and Magnetism", R Nave – Hyperphysics, Georgia State University
 Frank Wolfs's lectures at University of Rochester, chapters 23 and 24
 Fields – a chapter from an online textbook

Electrostatics
Physical quantities
Electromagnetism